Lukanisman bin Awang Sauni (born 1 February 1982) is a Malaysian politician who has served as the Deputy Minister of Health in the Pakatan Harapan (PH) administration under Prime Minister Anwar Ibrahim and Minister Zaliha Mustafa since December 2022, Chairman of the Sustainable Energy Development Authority (SEDA) since April 2020 and the Member of Parliament (MP) for Sibuti since May 2018. He is a member of the Parti Pesaka Bumiputera Bersatu (PBB), a component party of the Gabungan Parti Sarawak (GPS) and formerly Barisan Nasional (BN) coalitions.

Lukanisman was born in Miri and is of mixed ethnic Melanau and Chinese descent. He obtained a bachelor's degree from University of Malaya. Prior to joining politics, he worked at the Special Affairs Department (JASA).

He contested for Sibuti at the 2018 election, where he defeated 2 opposition candidates — Jemat Panjang and Zulaihi Bakar, with a majority of 3,676 votes. As an MP from Sarawak, he has been putting efforts to make Niah Cave as a UNESCO World Heritage Site. He is also a member of the Young Parliamentary Caucus within the Dewan Rakyat.

Election results

References 

Living people
Malaysian Muslims
Melanau people
Malaysian people of Chinese descent
1982 births
Malaysian politicians of Chinese descent